K. V. Kuppam may refer to:
 K. V. Kuppam (state assembly constituency)
 K. V. Kuppam block